Hatunqullpa (Quechua hatun big, qullpa salpeter, "big salpeter (mountain)", Hispanicized spelling Atuncollpa) is a mountain in the Wansu mountain range in the Andes of Peru, about  high. It is located in the Apurímac Region, Antabamba Province, Oropesa District, and in the Cusco Region, Chumbivilcas Province, Santo Tomás District. Hatunqullpa is situated north of the mountains Chankuwaña, Wayunka and  Pinta Pata and south-west of the mountain Pilluni.

The Hatun Qullpa valley (Jatun Collpa) lies northeast of the mountain. The waters of its intermittent stream flow to the river Qañawimayu.

References 

Mountains of Peru
Mountains of Apurímac Region
Mountains of Cusco Region